Zawidz  is a village in Sierpc County, Masovian Voivodeship, in east-central Poland. It is the seat of the gmina (administrative district) called Gmina Zawidz.

The village has a population of 900.

References

Villages in Sierpc County